Charlie Mills is a British animator known for creating The Trap Door and Stoppit and Tidyup with Terry Brain (who died in 2016). He and Brain had a company named CMTB Animations.

References

External links
 

1954 births
Film people from Bristol
British animated film directors
Living people